Mary Katherine "Katie" Ford (born 1955) is the former CEO of the modeling agency Ford Models, Inc. from 1995 until 2007.

Life and career
Ford is the daughter of Eileen Ford (née Ottensoser) and Gerard William "Jerry" Ford, who started the agency in 1946.  She holds a BA from Sarah Lawrence College and an MBA from Columbia University.

Ford worked for Strategic Planning Associates as a management consultant and TeleRep as a television sales representative.

Ford is active in the fight against human trafficking, and she is CEO of a nonprofit organization, Freedom For All.

Ford Models
Ford joined her parents' company in 1980. She took over as head in 1995 and moved operations from the Upper East Side to SoHo. She also expanded the company's reach by setting up offices in 10 other cities, including Chicago, Cleveland, Paris, and in Brazil and Argentina.

Still one of the largest modeling agencies in the world, they represent more than 2,500 clients, but smaller boutique agencies have grown in popularity. In recent years Ford has also have lost some of their most notable models, including Karen Elson, Maggie Rizer and Erin O'Connor, who were 'poached' by other agencies. Nonetheless, Ford's network of models include Sophie Dahl, Camilla Finn and Chanel Iman. Others Ford has represented include Kim Basinger, Adriana Lima, Mia Person, Rachel Hunter and Christie Brinkley.

In 2007, John Caplan became Ford Models' Chief Executive Officer, and she remained on the board of directors.

Family
Ford has a younger sister (Lacey), an older sister (Jamie) and an older brother (Bill).

Ford married hotelier André Balazs on November 16, 1985; they divorced in 2004. They have two daughters, Alessandra (born 1991) and Isabel (born 1994).  Ford lives in SoHo with her daughters.

References

External links

Sarah Lawrence College alumni
Columbia Business School alumni
1955 births
Living people
American women chief executives
Place of birth missing (living people)
American chief executives of fashion industry companies
People from SoHo, Manhattan
21st-century American businesswomen
21st-century American businesspeople